The 2021–22 Sydney Thunder Women's season was the seventh in the team's history. Coached by Trevor Griffin, the Thunder entered WBBL07 as the defending champions but ended the regular season in seventh place on the ladder, recording their worst finishing position across the league's first seven editions. Due to ongoing border restrictions related to the COVID-19 pandemic, they were not scheduled to play any games in their home state of New South Wales for the season. After captain Rachael Haynes announced she would be unlikely to participate in the season due to family reasons, Hannah Darlington was appointed to stand in as Haynes' replacement.

Squad 
Each 2021–22 squad was made up of 15 active players. Teams could sign up to five 'marquee players', with a maximum of three of those from overseas. Marquees were defined as any overseas player, or a local player who holds a Cricket Australia national contract at the start of the WBBL|07 signing period.

Personnel changes made ahead of the season included:

 English marquees Heather Knight and Tammy Beaumont did not re-sign with the Thunder in anticipation of a clashing schedule with national team duties.
 South African marquee Shabnim Ismail initially re-signed with the Thunder but withdrew from the tournament due to injury.
 Indian marquee Smriti Mandhana signed with the Thunder, returning to the league after previously playing for the Brisbane Heat and Hobart Hurricanes.
 Indian marquee Deepti Sharma and English marquee Issy Wong signed with the Thunder, marking their first appearances in the leagues.
 Rachel Trenaman departed the Thunder, signing with the Hobart Hurricanes.
 Corinne Hall signed with the Thunder, departing the Hobart Hurricanes.
 Having planned to miss the opening weeks while on parental leave, Rachael Haynes announced she would only be able to re-join the team later in the tournament pending sufficient changes to state border closures.
Changes made during the season included:

 Emily Smith was signed as a local replacement player, replacing Tahlia Wilson (leg injury) for one game on 16 October 2021.

The table below lists the Thunder players and their key stats (including runs scored, batting strike rate, wickets taken, economy rate, catches and stumpings) for the season.

Ladder

Fixtures 

All times are local

Statistics and awards 

 Most runs: Smriti Mandhana – 377 (10th in the league)
 Highest score in an innings: Smriti Mandhana – 114* (64) vs Melbourne Renegades, 17 November 2021
 Most wickets: Hannah Darlington – 16 (equal 5th in the league)
 Best bowling figures in an innings: Deepti Sharma – 3/13 (4 overs) vs Hobart Hurricanes, 31 October 2021
 Most catches (fielder): Phoebe Litchfield – 9 (4th in the league)
 Player of the Match awards:
 Samantha Bates, Sammy-Jo Johnson, Smriti Mandhana, Deepti Sharma, Issy Wong – 1 each
 WBBL|07 Team of the Tournament: Hannah Darlington
 WBBL|07 Young Gun Award: Phoebe Litchfield
 Alex Blackwell Medallist: Smriti Mandhana

References 

2021–22 Women's Big Bash League season by team
Sydney Thunder (WBBL)